Fisherman's Village is a waterfront mall, commercial boat anchorage, and tourist attraction located in the world's largest man-made small boat harbor in Los Angeles County at Marina del Rey, California. The Ballona Wetlands State Ecological Reserve is just east of Fisherman's Village and immediately to the south is the federally-owned riverine estuary of Ballona Creek. The historical Fisherman's Village that was built in 1967 is nestled on the eastern bank of main harbor entrance channel between Whiskey Reds restaurant to the south and the Windward boatyard to the north.

Fisherman's Village was developed and built by the Sheldon L. Pollack Corporation, which also developed and/or built several other similar projects in Southern California including San Diego Seaport Village, Port Hueneme Fisherman's Village (now called Fisherman's Wharf Channel Islands Harbor) and Oceanside Harbor Village.  

Constructed in the style of a New England fishing village, Fisherman's Village comprises five brightly painted wooden buildings, a waterfront promenade, a lighthouse, water fountain and commercial boat docks. Tourist attractions include live music concerts, restaurant and café dining, harbor and fishing cruises, boat and bicycle rentals, a Catalina Island ferry service, souvenir shops, a nightclub and a public water shuttle (harbor ferry) service.

The waterfront promenade offers panoramic views of the harbor in which approximately 5,300 pleasure boats, yachts and commercial vessels, berthed in 21 individual marinas including yacht clubs.

Various types of ocean-going vessels can be seen as they pass Fisherman's Village en route to or returning from voyages into Santa Monica Bay, Catalina Island, the Pacific Ocean and beyond. On Wednesday evenings during March to September from 5 pm to 7 pm, up to 100 sailboats from 22 to 70 feet in length can be seen, sails unfurled, racing toward the finishing line in California Yacht Club's (CYC) Sunset Series regatta.

Fisherman's Village address is 13755 Fiji Way, Marina del Rey, California, 90292-6909. It is situated on Los Angeles County land (public land) and designated as parcel #56 by the DBH (Department of Beaches and Harbors). DBH lease the parcels on the public's behalf. The adjoining public parking lot #1 is managed by Parking Concepts International (PCI) on behalf of DBH.

The leasee of Fisherman's Village is 'Gold Coast Village, LLC' who have appointed their property management company, 'Pacific Ocean Management'. The leasee also holds other parcels in Marina Del Rey such as Admiralty Apartments on Admiralty Way, Marina Beach strip mall on Washington Boulevard and Pier 44/Dock 77 marinas. Shoreline Village in Long Beach is another lease held.

Other entities of note adjoining Fisherman's Village are: US Coast Guard station, MDR LA Sheriff's Department station, the LA County Department of Beaches and Harbors (DBH) executive offices, Whiskey Red's restaurant, Villa Venetia apartment complex and UCLA rowing sheds to the south and Loyola Marymount University (LMU) rowing sheds, The Boatyard and DBH trailer offices to the North-east.

Since the late 1970s, Fisherman's Village has faced a decline of stores closing due to the leasing issues. A seal cage was emptied and various arcades for pinball machines and video games closed, including an eponymous arcade owned by actor Gary Coleman in the early 1990s. At times, the boat tours were shut down as well.

There has been an effort to rebuild Fisherman's Village with a parking complex, however, due to the millions of dollars involved in order to add new shops and stores, as well as the influx of heavy traffic, it had to go through several environmental impact reports before any demolition could take place. No decision has been made at this time.

The parking lot had to start charging fees in order to pay for the maintenance of Fisherman's Village.

Attractions
Live Music: Free concerts are held in fountain square, near the lighthouse, both weekend afternoons throughout the year, weather permitting. Concert times are 1pm - 4pm, or 2pm - 5pm during daylight saving time. Musical styles are varied and can include; Jazz, Funk, Blues, Reggae, Rockabilly, Salsa and Rock.
Dining: Restaurants 'El Torito' (Mexican) and 'Sapori' (Italian) offer licensed waterfront dining, whereas, 'Cafe Al Fresco', 'Thai Garden Cafe' and 'Lighthouse Grill' offer quick gourmet meals, snacks and drinks.
Harbor Cruises: Tiki Mermaid Charters and Hornblower Cruises offer fully catered and licensed private party harbor cruises and public cruises on weekends and for celebrations such as; July 4, the Marina Del Rey Boat Parade in December, Valentine's Day and New Year's Eve. Cruises depart from the docks.
Boat Rentals: Hourly/daily rental of power, sail and electric boats and kayaks is available 7 days on the docks.
Bicycling: Fisherman's Village connects with the Ballona Creek Bike Path and South Bay Bicycle Trails that combine more than 26 miles of coastal beach riding. Rentals are available from 'Daniel's Bicycle Rental & Sales'.
Fishing: Public 'Open Party' fishing trips are offered twice daily from the docks.
Fireworks: The annual 4 July and New Year's Eve fireworks are released from a barge in the main channel near Fisherman's Village. The promenade provides a good vantage point from which to view the display.
Boat Parade: The Annual Marina del Rey Holiday Boat Parade (Festival of Lights) is held the 2nd Saturday in December. Boaters decorate their vessels for the holidays and parade through the Marina to be judged for their creativity by a panel. Fisherman's Village and nearby Burton Chace Park offer the best sites for viewing the parade.
Boat Brokers: Mason Yacht Sales provides boat brokerage services.
The UCLA and LMU rowing teams practice both in nearby Ballona Creek and in the harbor's main channel.

In popular culture
Scenes involving The Bluth Banana Stand in the television program Arrested Development were filmed next to the lighthouse in Fisherman's Village.  Although set in Newport Beach and Balboa Island, the show was primarily filmed in locations around Culver City and Marina del Rey.
The dates that occur on the program Blind Date have often been filmed at Shanghai Red's, a restaurant at the far end of Fisherman's Village.
The Village was also the filming location for several scenes in the popular Fox TV series, The O.C.
A date scene for an episode of More to Love was filmed aboard the Tiki Mermaid Charter boat in 2009.
Scenes from a 3rd season episode of Greek were filmed in Fountain square, Fisherman's Village on January 5 & 6, 2010.
Scenes from District Nurse (2016), a lo-fi British chiller, were filmed throughout March 2014 in and around the nearby Boat Yard
Scenes from Breezy (1973) with William Holden and Kay Lenz shopping for groovy clothing. 
The scene with the boat party from ''Booksmart (2019) was filmed here

Sources
Virtual Tourist: Marina del Rey

Marina del Rey, California
Shopping malls in the South Bay, Los Angeles
Buildings and structures in Los Angeles County, California